Cry Your Heart Out may refer to:

 "Cry Your Heart Out", a song by Olly Murs from the album Right Place Right Time, 2012
 "Cry Your Heart Out", a song by Adele from the album 30, 2021